The 1951 Tangerine Bowl was an American college football bowl game played following the 1950 season, on January 1, 1951, at the Tangerine Bowl stadium in Orlando, Florida. The game featured the Emory and Henry Wasps and the Morris Harvey Golden Eagles (now the Charleston Golden Eagles).

Background
The Wasps were champions of the Smoky Mountain Conference and entered the game with a record of 9–1, including a victory over the Appalachian State Mountaineers in the Burley Bowl played on Thanksgiving Day (November 23, 1950) in Johnson City, Tennessee. The Golden Eagles came into the game with a record of 9–0.

Game summary
The only scoring in the first quarter was a touchdown by Emory and Henry, giving them a 7–0 lead.  In the second quarter, Morris Harvey answered with two touchdowns, and had a 14–7 lead at halftime.  Each team equaled their first-half scoring during the third quarter, to see Morris Harvey take a 28–14 lead.  In the fourth quarter, Morris Harvey added one more touchdown, giving them a 35–14 victory. Morris Harvey quarterback Pete Anania threw four touchdown passes; three of them were caught by end Charles Hubbard. Anania and Hubbard were named the game's outstanding back and lineman, respectively.

References

Tangerine Bowl
Citrus Bowl (game)
Charleston Golden Eagles football
Emory and Henry Wasps football
Tangerine Bowl
Tangerine Bowl